Fushi class tanker is a class of naval auxiliary ship currently in service with the People's Liberation Army Navy (PLAN), and has received NATO reporting name Fushi class. The exact type remains unknown, and a total of eight of this class have been confirmed in active service as of early 2020s. The hull is adopted for both transport oil tanker (AOT) and water tanker (AWT).

Fushi class ships in PLAN service are designated by a combination of two Chinese characters followed by a three-digit number. The second Chinese character is Shui (水), meaning water in Chinese, because these ships are classified as water tankers. The first Chinese character denotes which fleet the ship is service with, with East (Dong, 东) for East Sea Fleet, North (Bei, 北) for North Sea Fleet, and South (Nan, 南) for South Sea Fleet. However, the pennant numbers are subject to change due to the change of Chinese naval ships naming convention, or when units are transferred between different fleets. Specification:
Length: 55 meter

References

Auxiliary ships of the People's Liberation Army Navy